The speculatores also known as the speculatores augusti or the exploratores were an ancient Roman reconnaissance agency. They were part of the consularis and were used by the Roman military. The speculatores were headquartered in the Castra Peregrina. 

This organization probably originated from previous Greek military spies and scouts. There are references to a Roman scouting agency operating during the Samnite Wars and the speculatores being employed during the Roman war with the Aequi. Emperor Augustus reformed the Roman communications system. Among other reforms, he also added 10 speculatores to each legion. With one speculator per cohort. They also served in the Praetorian Guard. They also served as political police. Although they were replaced by the frumentarii as police in the third century. As bodyguards, they were tasked with clearing the emperor's pathway of crowds. To do this, they used a type of non-lethal spear known as a lancea. They also served as scouts, executioners, torturers, and assassins. During their operations, they worked in small numbers. Usually in pairs or as individuals. The speculatores were trained by an official known as a centurio exercitator to become skilled in fighting, horseriding, parading, and escorting. Three other officials had important roles in the speculatores. These were the centurio and the centurio speculatorum, centurio trecenarius, and the centurio speculatorum equitarum. There were around 300 members of the speculatores. They were chosen based on their discretion and loyalty. Many speculatores would go on to become couriers. Their duties lead to them becoming feared and despised by the populace.

References

Bibliography 
 
 
 
 
 
 
 
 
 
 
 
 
 
 
 
 
 
 
 

Infantry units and formations of ancient Rome
Army reconnaissance units and formations